Women's international rugby union has a history going back to the late 19th century, but it was not until 1982 that the first international fixture (or "test match") involving women's rugby union took place. The match was organised in connection with the Dutch Rugby Union's 50th anniversary: as part of the celebrations, on June 13, 1982, the French national women's team played the Dutch in Utrecht, Netherlands, with France winning 4–0 in a game that has since been recognised as the first ever women's international rugby union match.

Official recognition of women's internationals was not immediate, as almost all women's rugby was originally organised outside of the control of either national unions or World Rugby (WR) for many years. Partly as a result, no internationally agreed list of rugby internationals exists; even in the men's game, WR does not decide which matches are "full internationals" (or "test matches"), leaving such decisions up to participating unions.

As a result, one country may classify a match as a full international (and award full test caps) while the opposition may not: countries may even award caps for games against an opposition that is not a national team (World XVs, for example).

International rugby initially grew slowly. Sweden joined France and the Netherlands in 1984, followed by Italy in 1985. It was not until 1987 with a U.S. v. Canada matchup that the first international took place outside Europe, and not until 1990, with New Zealand hosting a match, that the first match was played by a Southern Hemisphere team or played in the Southern Hemisphere. However, since 2003 the game has expanded rapidly, and now over 50 nations have played at least one "test match".

Over 1,000 internationals have now been played. Traditional centres of rugby in New Zealand, England, and France have been the most successful nations, but they have been joined by a number of "non-traditional" nations who have also been successful, such as the United States and Canada.

Rankings
Unlike men's rugby, there was historically no official ranking of women's teams — prior to 2016, WR generally referred to the placings in the preceding World Cup. However, Rugby Europe compiles an annual ranking of European teams and rugby statistician Serge Piquet has produced a currently unofficial, but generally accepted, world ranking list. Another list appears on The Roon Ba website.

On 1 February 2016, WR introduced its first official rankings of women's national teams, calculated in virtually the same manner as the existing rankings for men's national teams.

International women's matches
Definition of an "international":

Individual unions compile their own international records. As a result, the list below will conflict with some of these "official" records (much in the same way as they will conflict with each other) as unions:
may not include some games in their official records because they fielded a below strength team in a tournament for full international XVs, or
may include games which are not listed below because they fielded a full strength team in a friendly against an unofficial or "A" team.

For consistency this list has used the following criteria when defining what is or is not an international:

Tournament games between national representative XVs from tournaments for full international teams, regardless of an individual union's selection policy;
"Friendly" fixtures which it appears were generally promoted prior to the game as being between full strength national XVs. In case of doubt the opinion of the home union – i.e. the promoter of the game – has carried the most weight.
Fixtures between official national selections and supra-national teams (such as "World XVs").

World Rugby Rankings (women) 

The World Rugby Rankings for women is a ranking system for women's national teams in rugby union, managed by World Rugby, the sport's governing body. The teams of World Rugby's member nations are ranked based on their game results, with the most successful teams being ranked highest. A point system is used, with points being awarded based on the results of World Rugby-recognized international matches. The women's rankings are calculated in the same manner as WR's existing men's rankings, with minor adjustments to reflect historic differences between women's and men's rugby.

Women's Test Ranking (unofficial)
Before early 2016, there was no official World Rugby ranking list for women's rugby. Several unofficial lists have been produced, with the list developed by Serge Piquet in 2009 having widest circulation following its adoption by women's rugby website ScrumQueens.com in 2013.

The system is similar in many ways to that used by WR for its men's rankings, and includes data from every women's international match since 1982.

Match points are awarded to each country as follows:

1. Match level – generally the mean of combined points the two teams before the match, with a minima.

2. The result  – 400 points for a win, 200 for a draw, 100 for a defeat or 0 for a forfeit in an official competition.

3. Match venue – 100 points is shared between the two teams. A team playing at home against an opponent from another continent gets 0 point, but 100 is awarded to their opponents. 25 points goes to the home team if the opponent is from the same continent, and 75 for their opponents. 50 goes to each team if they are playing on neutral ground.

4. Number of scored points and the points difference.

5. World Cup – a bonus of 50 points for games in qualifying rounds, 100 in pool phases of the finals, 150 for playoffs and 200 for the final.

Matches against A, B, Emerging, Amateur, Junior, Student, Army, Police or Services teams (and provinces/clubs when these games are part of official competitions) are also taken into account.

Nomads, Caribbean Select XV and Great Britain awarded ranking points but not a ranking position.

After each match a team's new ranking points total will be equal to the sum of 10% of their match points, and 90% of the ranking number before the match. This method evens out occasional surprise results and ensures that the ranking rewards consistency of performance.

Finally, in order that current form is given priority over historic performances, points gained from past matches decrease by 2% per year.

Differences between men's and women's rankings 

Although the ranking is similar in principle to that produced by WR for men's rugby since 2003 and women's rugby since 2016, there are some differences that take into account differences in women's rugby.

The WR system, for both men and women, does not account for the level of the teams — the winner gains some points, and the loser loses them, regardless of the relative levels of the opponents. This means that a lower-tier team will lose ranking points with a loss to a higher-tier team, even if the result is much closer than expected. Given the sometimes wide variation in strength of teams — even in the same competition — this is too simplistic for women's rugby.

The WR ranking also does not account for matches against "special" teams, especially those that are not WR members — but for many of the smaller women's nations, games against teams such as England "A" are more significant, tougher, and often as good a guide to their strength, if not better, than those against some full-strength test teams. As a result, such games are included in this ranking.

Finally, a new team added to WR's rankings is arbitrarily awarded a fixed number of points (currently 30 in the men's game, and 40 in the women's game). before December 2012, a men's team had to play at least 10 matches to be classified. Given the number of tests women's teams play this would be a significant barrier to inclusion.

An alternative ranking is available at the site 22metri and is based on the WR calculation method applied to the games played from January 2010 with teams  assigned an arbitrary starting points of 40, 30 and 20 based on tier. The ranking is similar to the one from Scrumqueens, as expected.

Highest team scores
up to and including 24 November 2018

Note: An unofficial international between a Uganda XV and a Rwanda XV at Kampala on 4 December 2004 resulted in a 183–0 win to the Uganda XV.

Sources of women's international results
The above results have been traced mainly via the following listings of national and tournament results – most being national RFUs. Other results have been traced via numerous news reports.
 Complete for 1994–2006, some errors in dates.
England (1998–)
FIRA European Championships (2003–)
France (1982–2004)
France (1990–)
Germany (rather incomplete)
International Rugby Board (2006–, Six Nations and World Cup only)
Japan (1994–2002)
Netherlands (2003–)
Norway (2002–)
New Zealand (1991–)
RBS Six Nations (2004–)
Sweden (1984–2005)
USA (complete, some errors)
Wales (1987–, some gaps, some errors)

Women's rugby participation rates
Ratio of registered female rugby players to the total female population.

Source: ScrumQueens

See also

Canada Cup
Caribbean Women's Rugby Championship
FIRA Women's European Championship
Scottish Women's Rugby Union
Women's international rugby union results summary
Pacific Tri-Nations
Women's rugby
Women's Rugby World Cup
Women's Six Nations Championship
Women's International Rugby Union Sevens
Women's international rugby union results summary
List of women's international rugby union test matches
Women's international rugby union (non test matches)
Rugby Africa Women's Cup

Notes

External links
 
Rugbydata includes women's internationals (18 March 2010 to 16 March 2014)
Entire list of internationals (13 June 1982 to 28 April 2012) in a Google Documents spreadsheet.
The rise and popularity of women's rugby in Canada, by John A O'Hanley (1998)
Official women's World Rankings